"Exhale" is an international maxi single (CDM) recorded in New York City by Serbian-Turkish recording artist Emina Jahović. It was released on 18 June 2008 through Multimedia Records. Jahović's first maxi single in English, Exhale, was completely produced and recorded in the United States under the production wing of Bojan Dugić (aka Bojan "Genius" Dugic), the Recording Academy's GRAMMY Awards voting member who worked with such best selling artists as Beyoncé, Britney Spears, Jay-Z, and Jennifer Lopez.

The maxi single contained remix tracks by DJs, including Elvir Gazić and Levent Gündüz. The tracks "Push It" and "Push It (Remix)" feature American rapper Cory Gunz.

World Sings Competition
The song "Exhale" was nominated for "World's Best Song" in Worldsings.com's music competition in which the top 20 most voted songs performed in Las Vegas, Nevada for $1,000,000.

Music video
On 19 April 2008, the accompanying video for "Exhale" premiered on the MTV Adria show TOP 20 which counts down the biggest videos in the localized version of the music and entertainment channel MTV Europe. Emir Khalilzadeh directed the video.

Release
The album was released through Multimedia Records in 2008.

Track listing

Notes

References

External links
Maxi Single Page in Multimedia Record's Official Website

2008 singles
Emina Jahović songs
2008 songs
Songs written by Emina Jahović